The 1949 Grand Prix motorcycle racing season was the inaugural F.I.M. Road Racing World Championship Grand Prix season. The season consisted of six Grand Prix races in five classes: 500cc, 350cc, 250cc, 125cc and Sidecars 600cc. It began on 17 June, with Isle of Man TT and ended with Nations Grand Prix on 4 September.

1949 Grand Prix season calendar

Standings

Scoring system
Points were awarded to the top five finishers in each race with an extra point for the race finisher with the fastest lap. All rounds counted towards the championship in the 125cc, 250cc and Sidecar categories, while in the 350cc and 500cc championships, only the best three results counted.

500cc final standings

Constructors' 500cc World Championship

350cc final standings

250cc final standings

125cc final standings

Sidecar final standings

References
 Büla, Maurice & Schertenleib, Jean-Claude (2001). Continental Circus 1949–2000. Chronosports S.A. 

Grand Prix motorcycle racing seasons
1949 in Grand Prix motorcycle racing